Helmut Rahner (born 29 March 1971) is a German former professional football who played as a defender. In his career, he played for Blau-Weiß 90 Berlin, Bayer Uerdingen, 1. FC Nürnberg and Rot-Weiss Essen.

Career
Born in Weingarts (Kunreuth municipality), Rahner played youth football for 1. FC Nürnberg. He began playing senior football for Blau-Weiß 90 Berlin.

Rahner spent most of his career with Bayer 05 Uerdingen (later renamed KFC Uerdingen 05) playing in the Bundesliga. He also had brief spells in Scotland with Kilmarnock and Italy with A.C. Reggiana 1919.

References

External links
 

Living people
1971 births
German footballers
Association football defenders
Bundesliga players
2. Bundesliga players
Rot-Weiss Essen players
1. FC Nürnberg players
KFC Uerdingen 05 players
Kilmarnock F.C. players
A.C. Reggiana 1919 players

German expatriate footballers
German expatriate sportspeople in Scotland
Expatriate footballers in Scotland
German expatriate sportspeople in Italy
Expatriate footballers in Italy